Paul Bernhard Gerhard (10 March  1824 in Leipzig – 19 May 1906 in St. Louis, Missouri) was a German entomologist who specialised in Lepidoptera.

Published works
1851–1853 Versuch einer Monographie der europäischen Schmetterlingsarten : Thecla, Polyomattus, Lycaena, Nemeobius ; Mit colorirten Abbildungen Hamburg ; Leipzig : W. Gerhard

References
Weidner, H., 1993 [Gerhard, P. B.]  Mitt. Hamburg. Zool. Mus. Inst., Hamburg 90:112-114
Olivier, A., 1999: [Gerhard, P. B.]  Phegea, Antwerpen 27 (4):127-140

German lepidopterists
1908 deaths
1824 births
Scientists from Leipzig
19th-century German zoologists
20th-century German zoologists